Thanks a Million is a 1935 musical film produced and released by 20th Century Fox and directed by Roy Del Ruth.  It stars Dick Powell, Ann Dvorak and Fred Allen, and features Patsy Kelly, David Rubinoff and Paul Whiteman and his band with singer/pianist Ramona. The script by Nunnally Johnson was based on a story by producer Darryl F. Zanuck (writing as Melville Crossman) and contained uncredited additional dialogue by Fred Allen, James Gow, Edmund Gross and Harry Tugend.

Thanks a Million was nominated for the Academy Award for Sound (E. H. Hansen) in 1935. It was remade in 1946 as If I'm Lucky, with Perry Como and Phil Silvers in the Powell and Allen roles.

Plot
Stranded in a small town in a downpour, the manager of a traveling musical show (Fred Allen) convinces the handlers of a boring long-winded local judge running for governor (Raymond Walburn) to hire his group to attract people to the politician's rallies.  When the show's crooner, Eric Land (Dick Powell), upstages the judge, he's fired, but on a return visit he saves the day by standing in for the judge, who is too drunk to speak.

Impressed by his poise, the party's bosses ask Eric to take over as candidate. The singer, knowing he has no chance to win, agrees for the exposure and the radio airtime in which he can showcase his singing. Soon, though, his girlfriend Sally (Ann Dvorak) becomes annoyed at the amount of time Eric is spending with the wife of one of the bosses, and she leaves when she thinks he has lied to her.

When the bosses ask Eric to agree to patronage appointments that will lead to easy graft for all of them, he exposes them on the radio, telling the voters that voting for him would be a huge mistake and urging them to vote for his opponent.  At the end Eric is, of course, elected governor, then reunited with Sally.

Cast
Dick Powell as Eric Land
Ann Dvorak as Sally Mason
Fred Allen as Ned Allen
Patsy Kelly as Phoebe Mason
Raymond Walburn as Judge Culliman
Benny Baker as Tammany
Alan Dinehart as Mr. Kruger
Andrew Tombes as Mr. Grass
Paul Harvey as Maxwell
Edwin Maxwell as Mr. Casey
Charles Richman as Gov. Wildman
Paul Whiteman as himself
Ramona as herself
David Rubinoff as himself
Yacht Club Boys

Songs
All music by Arthur Johnston, all lyrics by Gus Kahn.

 Sittin' On A Hill Top
 Thanks A Million
 New Orleans
 Sugar Plum
 Pocketful O' Sunshine
 The Square Deal Party

References

Green, Stanley (1999) Hollywood Musicals Year by Year (2nd ed.), pub. Hal Leonard Corporation  page 49

External links

1935 films
American black-and-white films
American musical comedy films
1930s English-language films
Films directed by Roy Del Ruth
1935 musical comedy films
Twentieth Century Pictures films
Films produced by Darryl F. Zanuck
20th Century Fox films
Films scored by Arthur Lange
1930s American films